9564 Jeffwynn, provisional designation , is an eccentric asteroid and Mars-crosser from the inner regions of the asteroid belt, approximately 4.7 kilometers in diameter.

The asteroid was discovered on 26 September 1987, by American astronomer couple Carolyn and Eugene Shoemaker at Palomar Observatory in California, United States. It was named for American geophysicist Jeffrey C. Wynn.

Orbit and classification 

Jeffwynn is a stony asteroid that orbits the Sun at a distance of 1.6–3.1 AU once every 3 years and 7 months (1,307 days). Its orbit has an eccentricity of 0.32 and an inclination of 22° with respect to the ecliptic.

Physical characteristics 

Jeffwynn has been characterized as a common, stony S-type asteroid by photometry from the Sloan Digital Sky Survey.

Lightcurves 

In September 2012, a rotational lightcurve of Jeffwynn was obtained from photometric observations by American astronomer Brian Warner at his Palmer Divide Observatory in Colorado. Lightcurve analysis gave a well-defined rotation period of  hours with a brightness variation of 0.16 magnitude.

Diameter and albedo 

The Collaborative Asteroid Lightcurve Link calculates a diameter of 4.7 kilometers with an absolute magnitude of 14.0 and an assumed albedo for stony asteroids of 0.20.

Naming 

This minor planet was named in honor of American Jeffrey C. Wynn, research geophysicist with the United States Geological Survey, described as a "humorous, curious, inventive, adventurous geophysicist", who examined the Saudi Arabian Wabar craters on several expeditions in 1994 and 1995, together with Eugene Shoemaker, after whom the minor planet 2074 Shoemaker is named. Wynn's research included mapping the seafloor, analyzing terrestrial minerals, and studying aquifers and archaeological sites. He also observed with the comet-discovering Shoemaker-Levy team. The official naming citation was published by the Minor Planet Center on 23 November 1999.

Notes

References

External links 
 Asteroid Lightcurve Database (LCDB), query form (info )
 Dictionary of Minor Planet Names, Google books
 Asteroids and comets rotation curves, CdR – Observatoire de Genève, Raoul Behrend
 Discovery Circumstances: Numbered Minor Planets (5001)-(10000) – Minor Planet Center
 
 

009564
Discoveries by Eugene Merle Shoemaker
Discoveries by Carolyn S. Shoemaker
Named minor planets
19870926